70th Troop Command is a Troop command of the Missouri Army National Guard.

Structure
175th Military Police Battalion
205th Military Police Battalion
139th Medical Group
229th Medical Battalion
7th WMD Civil Support Team

References

External links

Military units and formations in Missouri
Troop Commands of the United States Army National Guard